Viacheslav Zhukov (born c. 1989) is a Russian professional poker player who has won two World Series of Poker bracelets. Prior to becoming a professional poker player, Zhukov was a geologist in Russia.  he has career earnings of $940,000, $838,000 of which was earned at the World Series of Poker.

World Series of Poker

Bracelets
He won a WSOP bracelet in his first World Series of Poker (WSOP) cash in the 2011 Omaha Hi-Low Split-8 or Better Championship. The final table included bracelet winners Steve Billirakis, Richard Ashby, and Josh Arieh. He won his second bracelet in the 2012 Pot-Limit Omaha Hi-Low Split-8 or Better event. The 2012 bracelet's final table included bracelet winners David "ODB" Baker, Chris Bell, Randy Ohel and Scotty Nguyen. It took approximately three hours of heads up play for Zhukov to clinch his second bracelet. In both of his bracelet wins, Zhukov began the final table short stacked, and in both wins he had not finished in the money in any previous event at that World Series. Zhukov claims not to be an Omaha Hi-Lo specialist although both his bracelets were in that event. Zhukov claims that he plays mostly limit events on the internet. Winning two bracelets tied Zhukov for the most by a Russian native. At the time of his second bracelet win, only six Russians had won any World Series of Poker bracelets. Zhukov noted that Russians consider Ukrainians such as Oleksii Kovalchuk to be countrymen, when counting bracelet totals.

Notes

External links 
 Viacheslav Zhukov at Card Player.com
 Viacheslav Zhukov at WSOP.com
 Viacheslav Zhukov at Bluff Magazine
 Viacheslav Zhukov at Hendon Mob

1980s births
Living people
People from Stary Oskol
Russian poker players
World Series of Poker bracelet winners
Year of birth uncertain